Laka or Lau is a Central Sudanic language spoken in Nigeria. It is most closely related to Kabba Laka of Chad. The Hausa refer to the Laka people of Lau as Lakawa. The language was only recently documented in the mid-2010s, and had been previously misclassified as a Mbum language along with Lau.

Distribution
Laka speakers live in Laka ward of Lau LGA (Hausa: Angawan Lakawa; formerly Garin Lakawa ‘Laka town’), Taraba State, eastern Nigeria. They live alongside the Win Lau (or Lau proper; formerly Lau Habe), who are Jukunoid speakers.

Lexical comparison
The following table compares Laka (Lau) and Laka (Chad), both of which are Central Sudanic languages, with Lau proper, a Jukunoid language.

References

Bongo–Bagirmi languages
Languages of Nigeria